Vice president of Guatemala is a political position in Guatemala which is since 1966 elected concurrently with the position of President of Guatemala. The current Vice President is Guillermo Castillo Reyes.

The Vice President needs to be a Guatemalan citizen of over 40 years of age.

Historically, there have been provisions for multiple Vice Presidents or presidential designates elected for one-year-term. The election was carried in Congress of Guatemala. A provision for First and Second Vice Presidents existed 1882–1921, 1921–1928 and 1956–1966. A provision for First, Second and Third Vice Presidents existed 1921 and 1928–1944.

History of the office holders follows.

1882–1921

1921

1921–1928

1928–1944

1948–1951

1956–1966

1966 onwards

See also
List of current vice presidents

References

Government of Guatemala
Guatemala
 
1966 establishments in Guatemala